Diya Beeltah is a Mauritian model who was crowned Miss Mauritius 2012. Beeltah was born on 8 August 1988 in Quatre Bornes, Mauritius. Beeltah attended the Baichoo Madhoo Government school and completed her bachelor's degree in Human Resource Management from the University of Mauritius. She was pursuing her bachelor while making her breakthrough in modeling.

Beeltah was the first to represent Mauritius in the Miss Tourism World 2012 Beauty Contest which was held in Thailand. After reigning the title Miss Mauritius 2012, she became the ambassador and the national voice for road safety by the Mauritius Police Department and Ministry of Public Infrastructure, National Development Unit, Land Transport and Shipping National Development Unit. She also contributes to a NGO's in the fight against the spread of HIV/AIDS.

Early life and career
Beeltah was born on 8 August 1988 in Quatre Bornes, Mauritius. She attended the Baichoo Madhoo Government school for her primary education then joined the College Bon et Perpetuel Secours of Beau-Bassin for her secondary studies. Diya got a BSC in Human Resource Management from the University of Mauritius (UOM) in 2011, she announced her intention to pursue her master's degree in the same field and aspires to become a lecturer. Diya was working as a research assistant at the UOM.

Major competition and awards
Beeltah has been crowned Miss Mauritius 2012 by Ameeksha Dilchand (Miss Mauritius 2011) at the Auditorium of J&J, Phoenix on 30 June 2012. A week prior to the finale, she won the Best Dress Award which is a preliminary of the Miss Mauritius contest and came as runner up for the Miss Siren/Beach Beauty Award.

Beeltah started participating in beauty pageants from 2012. She was crowned Miss Mauritius in 2012 and went on to seek the nomination for Miss Tourism World and Miss Universe 2013. She took part in the Miss Tourism World 2012. The event was considered the rehearsal of the following Miss Universe pageant during 2013. Beeltah participated in Miss Universe 2013 held on 9 November 2013 at the Crocus City Hall, Krasnogorsk, a suburb of Moscow, Russia  as the official entry from Mauritius.

Social work
Beeltah is passionate about social work and in her own words, "Solving the social issues that exist in the world today is not going to be easy, but I still firmly believe that addressing poverty, providing the right education and instilling proper values would be a good start.” After reigning the title Miss Mauritius 2012, she became the ambassador and the national voice for road safety by the Mauritius Police Department and Ministry of Public Infrastructure, National Development Unit, Land Transport and Shipping National Development Unit. She also contributes to a NGO's in the fight against the spread of HIV/AIDS.

References

Living people
1988 births
People from Plaines Wilhems District
Mauritian female models
Mauritian beauty pageant winners
Mauritian people of Indian descent
Mauritian Hindus
Female models of Indian descent
Miss Universe 2013 contestants
HIV/AIDS activists
University of Mauritius alumni